Statskonsult AS is a defunct Norwegian government-owned company that provided management consulting services related to government restructuring and reform. It was created in 1947 as the Rationalisation Office, later the Directorate of Rationalisation. The name Statskonsult was taken into use in 1987. It was converted to a limited company on January 1, 2004, owned by the Norwegian Ministry of Government Administration and Reform with the intention of competing with other consulting companies within three years, but the change of government after the 2005 elections changed the plans. It merged with Norge.no and the Norwegian eProcurement Secretariat on July 1, 2007, to form the Agency for Public Management and eGovernment.

References

Formerly government-owned companies of Norway
Defunct government agencies of Norway
Companies based in Oslo
Organisations based in Oslo
Government agencies established in 1947
Companies established in 2004
Organizations disestablished in 2007
Norwegian companies established in 1947
2007 disestablishments in Norway